Susan Lozier is a physical oceanographer and the dean of the Georgia Institute of Technology's College of Sciences. Previously, she was the Ronie-Richelle Garcia-Johnson Professor of Earth and Ocean Sciences in the Nicholas School of the Environment at Duke University in Durham, North Carolina. Her research focuses on large-scale ocean circulation, the ocean's role in climate variability, and the transfer of heat and fresh water from one part of the ocean to another.

Education
Lozier received her Bachelor of Science degree from Purdue University in 1979, and her Master of Science (1984) and Doctor of Philosophy (1989) degrees from the University of Washington.

Professional work
Lozier was a post-doctoral fellow at the Woods Hole Oceanographic Institution before joining the faculty at Duke University. She is a principal investigator for the Overturning in the Subpolar North Atlantic Program (OSNAP), responsible for coordinating its international and national projects. Lozier was the first woman to graduate from the University of Washington's physical oceanography doctoral program, and is active in the community mentoring program, MPOWIR (Mentoring Physical Oceanography Women to Increase Retention). In 2020 she was elected to the American Academy of Arts and Sciences.

Lozier was the featured speaker for the 16th Annual Roger Revelle Annual Commemorative Lecture, sponsored by the National Academies and held at the National Museum of Natural History in Washington, D.C. on March 4, 2015, presenting her lecture on Overturning Assumptions: Past, Present, and Future Concerns about the Ocean's Circulation.

Lozier started a two-year term as president of the American Geophysical Union in 2021.

Select publications

Awards 
 Rachel Carson Award Lecture, American Geophysical Union (2001)
Ambassador Award, American Geophysical Union (2016)
Joanne Simpson Mentorship Award, American Meteorological Society (2017)
Member, American Academy of Arts and Sciences (2020)

References

External links
 Overturning in the Subpolar North Atlantic Program
 
 Autobiographical sketch in "Women in Oceanography: a Decade Later," E.S. Kappel. Oceanography: 27 (4), page 161

American oceanographers
Year of birth missing (living people)
Living people
Purdue University alumni
University of Washington alumni
Duke University faculty
Place of birth missing (living people)
physical oceanographers
Fellows of the American Academy of Arts and Sciences